Bernard J. Berry (July 3, 1913 – January 6, 1963) was an American Democratic Party politician who served as the 33rd mayor of Jersey City, New Jersey from 1953 to 1957. He took office following the resignation of John V. Kenny.

Biography
He was born on July 3, 1913.

Berry achieved a level of notoriety for having banned both rock and roll music as well as an "obscene" film from Jersey City during his tenure. Berry banned the film The Moon Is Blue from being shown for being "indecent and obscene" and refused to allow Bill Haley and the Comets to play a concert at municipally-owned Roosevelt Stadium. The latter act is believed to have inspired Haley to write the first protest song in rock and roll, "Teenager's Mother," which included the lyrics "Are you right? Did you forget too soon? How much you liked to do the Charleston?"

In 1956, after the 1954 closing of the US immigration station, Berry commandeered a US Coast Guard cutter and led a contingent of New Jersey officials on an expedition to claim Ellis Island.

He died on January 6, 1963.

References

External links
 Bernard Berry at Findagrave.com

Mayors of Jersey City, New Jersey
1913 births
1963 deaths
New Jersey Democrats
20th-century American politicians